Diego Hipólito da Silva Lopes (born 3 May 1994), known as Diego Lopes, is a Brazilian professional footballer who plays as a midfielder for Singapore Premier League club Lion City Sailors.

Career
Born in São Paulo, Lopes arrived in Portugal in December 2008, after a short spell at Palmeiras and joined Benfica. Rated by Rui Costa, as a top prospect, he helped the Lisbon-side, win their first Under-15 Championship since 1988–89.

On 10 June 2012, Lopes joined Rio Ave in Primeira Liga, and made his debut on 2 September 2012 in a draw against Académica. His first goal arriving twenty-four days later in a 2012–13 Taça da Liga match against Freamunde. A year later, on 3 August 2013, Lopes signed a permanent deal with Rio Ave for five seasons. After good performances in his third year in Vila do Conde, which included a career best, nine goals, he was touted for a return to Benfica.

The move was confirmed days later, when he rejoined Benfica on a five-year deal. However, he was not included in the first-team and was subsequently loaned to Turkish team Kayserispor alongside Derley. He scored his only goal for them in a Turkish Cup match against İnegölspor on 26 January, scoring the second goal in a 2–0 win. Lopes did not stay with the Turkish team, being loaned for six-months to América Mineiro in July 2016. After three months, América Mineiro terminated the loan deal ahead of time and returned him to Benfica.

In January 2017, Lopes was loaned for a third time, joining Panetolikos in the Super League Greece for 18 months. Panetolikos and Lopes parted ways on 13 January 2018. Three days later, he rejoined Rio Ave on a five-year contract.

On 20 January 2021, Lopes signed with Singapore club Lion City Sailors F.C. for a Singapore record transfer fee of S$2.9m (€1.8m).

Career statistics

Honours
Rio Ave
 Taça de Portugal: Runner-up 2013–14
 Taça da Liga:  Runner-up 2013–14
 Supertaça Cândido de Oliveira: Runner-up 2014
Lion City Sailors
 Singapore Premier League: 2021

References

External links
 
 

1994 births
Living people
Footballers from São Paulo
Brazilian footballers
Association football midfielders
Campeonato Brasileiro Série A players
América Futebol Clube (MG) players
Primeira Liga players
S.L. Benfica footballers
Rio Ave F.C. players
Süper Lig players
Kayserispor footballers
Super League Greece players
Panetolikos F.C. players
Brazilian expatriate footballers
Expatriate footballers in Portugal
Expatriate footballers in Turkey
Expatriate footballers in Greece
Brazilian expatriate sportspeople in Portugal
Brazilian expatriate sportspeople in Turkey
Brazilian expatriate sportspeople in Greece